Ropewalk is the fifth studio album by Scottish indie rock band the View. It was released on 4 September 2015 through Cooking Vinyl. The album was produced by Albert Hammond Jr. of The Strokes, and Gus Oberg, producer for the same band. Drew McConnell of Babyshambles introduced Kyle Falconer to the duo. The band chose to record the album at Clouds Hill studios, in Hamburg, Germany. Justin Gerrish, famous for his work with Vampire Weekend, produced the final mix in New York City.

Reception
Ropewalk received favourable reviews from critics. Metacritic gave the album a score of 74 out of 100, based on 4 critic reviews.
The NME gave it an 8/10 score on their review, saying:
"While the barometer of public taste has shifted from the days when working class boys-with-guitars were rife, you have to applaud The View for updating their legacy without resorting to déjà-View or an EDM chart-landgrab."

Track listing

Personnel

The View
Kyle Falconer - Lead vocals, rhythm guitar
Kieren Webster - Bass guitar, backing vocals
Pete Reilly - Lead guitar
Steven Morrison - Drums, percussion

Production
Albert Hammond Jr. - Producer
Gus Oberg - Producer
Justin Gerrish - Mixing

References

2015 albums
The View (band) albums
Cooking Vinyl albums